Nancy Waples (born 1960/1961) is an American lawyer and judge from Vermont who has served as an associate justice of the Vermont Supreme Court since 2022.

Early life and education 

Waples is the daughter of Chinese immigrants So Kam "Susie" Jear and Yee Roy Jear; she was born in Toronto, Canada and became a U.S. citizen in 1977. She graduated with a Bachelor of Arts from the College of William & Mary in 1982, and she earned a Juris Doctor from St. John's University School of Law in 1987.

Legal career 

Waples started her legal career serving as a prosecutor in the Manhattan District Attorney's office, working in the appeals bureau and trial division. She later served as an Assistant United States Attorney in the U.S. Attorney's office in the District of Vermont, where she served in the criminal division. Prior to her appointment as a judge she worked as a lawyer with the law firm Hoff Curtis where she focused on criminal defense.

Vermont judicial service

Superior court 
On December 29, 2014, Vermont Governor Peter Shumlin appointed Waples to the Vermont Superior Court to fill the vacancy left by the resignation of judge Geoffrey W. Crawford who was appointed to the Vermont Supreme Court.

Supreme Court 

On February 25, 2022, Governor Phil Scott announced the appointment of Waples as an associate justice of the Vermont Supreme Court, filling the seat vacated by the resignation of justice Beth Robinson on November 5, 2021, after Robinson was appointed to the United States Court of Appeals for the Second Circuit. Waples is the first woman of color to serve on the Vermont Supreme Court.

The Vermont Senate confirmed Waples' appointment on March 25, 2022. She was sworn into office on April 15, 2022.

References

External links 

1960s births
Living people
20th-century American women lawyers
20th-century American lawyers
21st-century American judges
21st-century American women lawyers
21st-century American lawyers
American jurists of Chinese descent
American lawyers of Chinese descent
American prosecutors
Assistant United States Attorneys
Canadian emigrants to the United States
College of William & Mary alumni
Criminal defense lawyers
Justices of the Vermont Supreme Court
Naturalized citizens of the United States
St. John's University School of Law alumni
Superior court judges in the United States
Vermont lawyers
Vermont state court judges
21st-century American women judges